Lonomia camox is a species of saturniid moth that was discovered by Claude Lemaire in 1971.

References 

Insects described in 1971
Hemileucinae